Four Rivers Bay is an Arctic waterway in the Qikiqtaaluk Region, Nunavut, Canada. It is located in Peel Sound on the western side of Somerset Island. It is immediately west of the permanently frozen Stanwell-Fletcher Lake.

References

 Four Rivers Bay at Atlas of Canada

Bays of Qikiqtaaluk Region